"Jaiye Jaiye" is a song by Nigerian singer Wizkid. It was released as the lead single from his second studio album, Ayo (2014). The song features Grammy-nominated Nigerian musician Femi Kuti. It peaked at number 2 on WorldCrunch, and at 6 on Haba Naija Top 10 music chart. Moreover, it peaked at number 10 on Afrobreakers September 2013 chart. The song was produced by Sarz and mastered by Foster Zeeno.

Background and recording
According to a behind the scenes video uploaded onto YouTube on 13 May 2013, the recording process started when Wizkid called Yeni Kuti and asked her if she could get her brother to collaborate with him. Kuti said she was shocked and surprised when she got the call from Wizkid. When she told her brother, he agreed to work with Wizkid. Femi Kuti said he was busy with Nigerian Idol and other projects at the time; he specifically told Wizkid to postponed their recording session. Wizkid and Femi Kuti ended up doing subsequent recording sessions. Femi Kuti said he puts his best into his music and it's only right he continues to do that when the likes of Wizkid come around.

Music video
The accompanying music video for "Jaiye Jaiye" was released onto YouTube on 26 October 2013, at a total length of 4 minutes and 11 seconds. The video was shot and directed by Sesan at the shrine. It features a creative cameo from Fela Anikulakpo Kuti.

On 2 October 2013, Wizkid uploaded several behind-the-scene photos of the video shoot onto his Instagram account.

Critical reception
Upon its release, "Jaiye Jaiye" was met with positive reviews. Ovie O of NotJustOk praised the song, adding, "Everything about this song speaks volumes. The beat progression, Femi's Sax, Wizkid's delivery… near-perfect. Wizkid is the present and the future." OkayAfrica added, "In 'Jaiye Jaiye,' Wizkid gets some staccato saxophone lines from Femi Kuti, riding out the brass melody  and Sarz beat with his signature high-pitched croons."

Accolades
The music video for "Jaiye Jaiye" was nominated for Best Music Video of the Year at the 2014 Nigeria Entertainment Awards.

Track listing
Digital download
"Jaiye Jaiye" (Wizkid featuring Femi Kuti) - 3:47
Covers
"Jaiye Jaiye" (Dunnie Acoustic cover) - 3:35

Release history

References

2013 songs
2013 singles
Wizkid songs
Yoruba-language songs
Song recordings produced by Sarz
Songs written by Wizkid